Love Is Beautiful may refer to:

 Love Is Beautiful (album), a 2007 album by Glay
 Love Is Beautiful (TV series), a 2002 Hong Kong costume drama